The Castle of Vila Flor is a medieval castle located in the civil parish of Vila Flor e Nabo, municipality of Vila Flor, Portuguese district of Bragança.

History

Early history
The presence of several ancient forts in ruins suggest indicates that the region has been occupied by prehistoric humans.

Medieval era
Archeological and anecdotal evidence places the establishment of the village at the height of the Christian Reconquest of the Iberian Peninsula in the eleventh century.

It and the region became part of the Kingdom of Portugal under King Afonso I of Portugal upon Portugal's independence. On 24 May 1286, King Dinis (1279–1325) granted a Foral Charter to the village, the first time of its existence in the record books. In 1295, the king raised the village to the status of town.

The village was sympathetic to Jewish families who were expelled from other parts of Europe. An influx of immigration led to the development of agriculture, trade and manufacturing of leather and jewelry.

King Manuel (1495–1521) handed the town a new Foral Charter  on 4 May 1512. However, the new charter was anti-Semitic and drove away a lot of Jews, resulting in a massive decline of the population.

Modern day
Over time, the castle saw its usefulness decline. The townspeople neglected to maintain the castle and the fortress slowly eroded due to the force of nature. The castle is mostly in ruins with a few parts left standing.

It was later decreed a site of public interest by the Portuguese government on 20 October 1955.

Characteristics

The castle is protected by a ring of wall that originally had five gates. Of these five ports, only one portcullis survives and is named as South Gate or Arch of D. Dinis. It is a pointed arch with dimensions of 3.5 meters wide by 4 meters high and is held by two semicircular plant towers.

References

Vila Flor
Vila Flor
National monuments in Bragança District